"Barrio" is a song performed by Italian singer Mahmood. The song was released as a digital download on 30 August 2019 by Island Records. The song peaked at number four on the Italian Singles Chart. The song was written by Alessandro Mahmoud, Dario Faini, Davide Petrella, Paolo Alberto Monachetti and produced by Charlie Charles and Dardust.

Background
On 26 August 2019, Mahmood released a teaser for his new single on social media. The song was produced by Dardust and Charlie Charles. The duo also produced the single "Calipso", which Mahmood features on. The song was certified gold in Italy. Wiwibloggs said, "A Latin slap in the face, the track comes with a contemporary beat that mixes exotic elements like a flamenco guitar with Mahmood’s signature sound. Inspired by the Francisco Tárrega, who composed the well-known piece "Capricho árabe" back in 1892, it unites Arabic and Spanish culture."

Track listing

Charts

Weekly charts

Year-end charts

Certifications

Release history

References

2019 songs
2019 singles
Mahmood (singer) songs
Songs written by Mahmood
Songs written by Dario Faini
Songs written by Davide Petrella